Commodore Shelton Cochran (January 20, 1902 – January 3, 1969) was an American athlete, winner of a gold medal in 4 × 400 m relay at the 1924 Summer Olympics.

He was born in Mississippi and died in San Francisco, California.

As a Mississippi State University student, Commodore Cochran won the NCAA championships in 440-yard dash in 1922 and 1923.

At the Paris Olympics, Cochran ran the opening leg in American 4 × 400 m relay team, which won the gold medal with a new world record of 3.16.0.

After his running career, Cochran coached his younger brother Roy Cochran, who won two gold medals at the 1948 Summer Olympics.

References

External links
profile

1902 births
1969 deaths
American male sprinters
Athletes (track and field) at the 1924 Summer Olympics
Medalists at the 1924 Summer Olympics
Mississippi State Bulldogs men's track and field athletes
Olympic gold medalists for the United States in track and field
Track and field athletes from Mississippi